São José Esporte Clube, more commonly referred to as São José, is a Brazilian football club based in São José dos Campos, São Paulo. The team compete in Campeonato Paulista Série A3, the third tier of the São Paulo state football league. Its home stadium is Estádio Martins Pereira, which has a maximum capacity of approximately 15,300.

History
The club was founded on August 13, 1933, as Esporte Clube São José, after Futebol Clube and Klaxon merged. The club merged in 1945 with Associação Esportiva São José to form São José Esporte Clube.

On March 8, 1964, São José became a professional club.

In December, 1976, due to a financial crisis, the club changed its name to São José Esporte Clube, with the purpose of not paying its debts. The club also changed its colors, which were black and white, to the current blue, yellow and white ones, and changed its logo.

In 1989, the club was runner-up of Campeonato Paulista, after beating Corinthians in the semifinals, and losing to São Paulo in the final, and runner-up of Campeonato Brasileiro Second Division, losing to Bragantino in the final, but being promoted to the following year's first division.

In 1996, São José won the Copa Vale after defeating Aparecida in the final.

In 2003, the club was renamed to Esporte São José, but in 2005, the club returned to its previous name, São José Esporte Clube. In 2006, São José moved back to Campeonato Paulista A-2.

Years in Campeonato Brasileiro Série A:
1982 Place: 12th out of 44
1990 Place: 19th out of 20

Achievements
Campeonato Paulista Série A2: 2
1972, 1980
Campeonato Paulista Série A3: 1
1965
Campeonato Paulista Série B: 2
1964, 2020
Campeonato Paulista: 
Runner-up (1): 1989Campeonato Brasileiro Série B: 
Runner-up (1): 1989

Notable players
 Émerson Leão
 Fidelis
 Roque Junior
 Sérgio Valentim
 Tião Marino

Stadium

São José's home pitch is Estádio Martins Pereira, inaugurated in 1970, with a maximum capacity of 15,317 people. On March 22, 1970, São José Esporte Clube played its first match in Estádio Martins Pereira. São José and Nacional (SP) drew 0-0.

Mascot
The Águia (Eagle) became the official mascot of São José in 1978, two years after São José changed their team colors. "Azulão do Vale" (Big Blue of the Valley) was the team's nickname before that, but they changed it to "Águia do Vale" when Águia became the team's mascot. Águia was chosen as the club mascot as eagles are driven animals and will fight to the end even against the odds.

Rivalry

The biggest rival of São José is Taubaté. The derby between the two clubs is known as O Clássico do Vale do Paraíba (The Paraíba Valley Classic).

The team that São José played most against is Santo André.

Kits

The current kits of São José are made by RT Sports, a local kit sponsor. Until December 1976, the club played in black and white vertical striped shirts, black shorts and white socks, not unlike Corinthians away kit.

Important matches
Finals of Campeonato Paulista A-1 1989
June 28 – São José 0–1 São Paulo
July 2 – São José 0–0 São Paulo

(Both games were in Morumbi in São Paulo)

Tour of Spain 1989
August 17 – São José 2–1 Torrevieja
August 19 – São José 1–1 Palamós
August 21 – São José 0–0 Córdoba
August 22 – São José 0–0 Martos
August 24 – São José 2–1 Réus Desportivo
August 25 – São José 1–0 Atlético Palma
August 27 – São José 3–1 Mollerussa
August 28 – São José 0–0 Estepona
August 29 – São José 2–1 Portullano

See also
 Women's team

References

External links
 São José EC Page
 hoa hòe 11bet

 
Football clubs in São Paulo (state)
Association football clubs established in 1933
Organisations based in São José dos Campos
1933 establishments in Brazil